Madina Memet (born 10 September 1987) is a Chinese actress of Uyghur ethnicity who first rose to prominence in 2011 for playing the Fragrant Concubine in the television series New My Fair Princess. Her breakthrough role came when she played Lan Shang in the epic fantasy television drama Ice Fantasy in 2016.

Early life
Madina Memet was born in Ürümqi, Xinjiang, on September 10, 1987, she is the youngest of five children. As a child, she liked dancing. In 1998, she was accepted to Beijing Shengji Art Academy and graduated in 2003. After graduation, she was assigned to Xinjiang Arts Theatre Troupe.

Career
Madina had her first experience in front of the camera in 2010, and she was chosen to act as a support actress as the Fragrant Concubine in New My Fair Princess, a television series based on the novel by the same name by Chiung Yao.

In January 2013, she starred in historical series Heroes in Sui and Tang Dynasties. In May, she featured in palace drama Legend of Lu Zhen. In June, she played the female lead role in the comedy television series Little Big Soldier, alongside Xiao Shenyang and Xu Lu. In August, she starred in Flowers in Fog, adapted from Chiung Yao's novel of the same title.

Madina's first film role was an unaccredited appearance in the film Ex-Files (2014). She then co-starred in the shenmo television series The Investiture of the Gods, based on Xu Zhonglin's novel of the same name. In April, she starred in Palace 3: The Lost Daughter, a historical romance television series by Yu Zheng.

In February 2015, Madina featured in Peter Pau's fantasy action adventure film Zhong Kui: Snow Girl and the Dark Crystal. She also featured in martial arts film The Final Master, where she received increased recognition for her acting.

In 2016, she starred in the epic fantasy television drama Ice Fantasy and gained more popularity for her role as the mermaid princess. In December, she was cast in the shenmo television series Ghost Catcher Zhong Kiu’s Record.

In 2017, Madina starred in the historical romance drama General and I. She reprised her role as Lan Shang in the modern sequel of Ice Fantasy, Ice Fantasy Destiny.

In 2018, Madina starred in romance drama  Summer's Desire, based on  Ming Xiaoxi's novel. She also starred in action comedy film Kung Fu League.

In 2019, Madina starred in the historical epic Chong Er's Preach, playing Li Ji.

Filmography

Film

Television series

Discography

References

External links

1987 births
Living people
Actresses from Xinjiang
Uyghur people
Chinese film actresses
Chinese television actresses
21st-century Chinese actresses
People from Ürümqi